This is a partial list of fictional universes created for comic books and animated film and television.

Animation
This is a partial list of fictional universes created for animated films or series.

Comics
This is a partial list of fictional universes created for comics.

Manga and webcomics 
This is a partial list of fictional universes created for manga and webcomics (manhwa, manhua, etc.).

References

Universes